George and Tammy Super Hits is an album by American country music artists George Jones and Tammy Wynette released on May 2, 1995 on the Epic Records.

Track listing

External links
 George Jones' Official Website
 Tammy Wynette's Official Website
 Epic Record Label

1995 greatest hits albums
George Jones compilation albums
Tammy Wynette albums
Epic Records compilation albums